Yu Chun-hsien (31 December 1901 – 21 January 1994) was a Taiwanese politician. He served as the President of the Control Yuan from 1973 to 1987.

Biography 
During his studies at Sun Yat-sen University (then known as National Kwangtung University), Yu often listened to Sun Yat-sen's speeches on the Three Principles of the People. Yu was deeply influenced by Sun Yat-sen's thought and he joined the Kuomintang in 1925.

He served as the editor-in-chief of the Indonesian "Republic of China Daily". Yu was arrested and imprisoned for 8 months for criticizing the Japanese government for obstructing the Northern Expedition. He returned to Nanjing soon after.

In 1949, Yu retreated to Taiwan following the Nationalist defeat in the Chinese Civil War. In 1973, he was elected as the President of the Control Yuan. He served as president until 1987, when he resigned due to old age.  After leaving office, he served as a senior adviser to the Presidential Office Building.

Yu died of illness in 1994. President Lee Teng-hui issued a statement acklowedging Yu's death.

References 

1901 births
Republic of China politicians from Guangdong
Kuomintang politicians in Taiwan
20th-century Taiwanese politicians
Sun Yat-sen University alumni
Taiwanese Presidents of the Control Yuan
1994 deaths
Senior Advisors to President Lee Teng-hui